Deraiophorus is a genus of mites in the order Mesostigmata, placed in its own family, Deriaphoridae.

Species

 Deraiophorus adriaticus Hirschmann & Zirngiebl-Nicol, 1972
 Deraiophorus aokii Hiramatsu, 1982
 Deraiophorus australis Hirschmann, 1973
 Deraiophorus baloghi Hirschmann, 1973
 Deraiophorus biroi G.Canestrini, 1897
 Deraiophorus borneoensis Hiramatsu, 1983
 Deraiophorus brasiliensis Hirschmann & Zirngiebl-Nicol, 1969
 Deraiophorus canestrinii Berlese, 1891
 Deraiophorus ceylonicus Hirschmann, 1973
 Deraiophorus chyzeri Canestrini, 1897
 Deraiophorus crassus Hiramatsu, 1979
 Deraiophorus dicornutosimilis Hirschmann, 1973
 Deraiophorus dicornutus Hirschmann, 1973
 Deraiophorus domrowi Hirschmann, 1973
 Deraiophorus endrodyi Hirschmann, 1973
 Deraiophorus foraminosus Hirschmann & Hiramatsu, 1990
 Deraiophorus haradai Hiramatsu, 1982
 Deraiophorus hexacornutosimilis Hirschmann, 1973
 Deraiophorus hexacornutus Hirschmann, 1973
 Deraiophorus hirschmanni Hiramatsu, 1977
 Deraiophorus hirschmannisimilis Hiramatsu, 1980
 Deraiophorus hummellincki Hirschmann, 1979
 Deraiophorus imadatei Hiramatsu, 1980
 Deraiophorus javensis Hiramatsu, 1980
 Deraiophorus kalimantanensis Hiramatsu, 1982
 Deraiophorus kaszabi Hirschmann, 1973
 Deraiophorus kaszabisimilis Hirschmann, 1973
 Deraiophorus kurosai Hiramatsu, 1979
 Deraiophorus lanatus Hirschmann, 1973
 Deraiophorus latus (Trägårdh, 1952)
 Deraiophorus leytensis Hirschmann & Hiramatsu, 1990
 Deraiophorus loksai Hirschmann, 1973
 Deraiophorus loksaisimilis Hirschmann, 1973
 Deraiophorus luzonensis Hirschmann & Hiramatsu, 1990
 Deraiophorus magnus Hiramatsu, 1982
 Deraiophorus mahunkai Hirschmann, 1973
 Deraiophorus manuleatus Hiramatsu & Hirschmann, 1978
 Deraiophorus matskasii Hirschmann, 1981
 Deraiophorus maya (Krantz, 1969)
 Deraiophorus melisi Hirschmann & Zirngiebl-Nicol, 1969
 Deraiophorus nemorivagus Hiramatsu, 1980
 Deraiophorus neobiroi Hirschmann, 1973
 Deraiophorus neobrasiliensis (Hirschmann & Zirngiebl-Nicol, 1969)
 Deraiophorus novaehollandiae (Domrow, 1957)
 Deraiophorus obscurus Hirschmann & Hiramatsu, 1990
 Deraiophorus orghidani Hutu, 1987
 Deraiophorus pecinai Hirschmann, 1990
 Deraiophorus penicillatasimiiis Hirschmann, 1973
 Deraiophorus penicillatus Hirschmann, 1973
 Deraiophorus piriformis Hirschmann, 1973
 Deraiophorus piriformoides Hirschmann & Hiramatsu, 1990
 Deraiophorus praelongus Hiramatsu & Hirschmann, 1978
 Deraiophorus pulchelloides Hirschmann & Zirngiebl-Nicol, 1972
 Deraiophorus rackae Hirschmann & Zirngiebl-Nicol, 1969
 Deraiophorus rosariae Hirschmann & Hiramatsu, 1990
 Deraiophorus schusteri Hirschmann & Zirngiebl-Nicol, 1969
 Deraiophorus sellnicki Hirschmann & Zirngiebl-Nicol, 1969
 Deraiophorus shiroyamaensis Hiramatsu, 1977
 Deraiophorus simplicior (Domrow, 1957)
 Deraiophorus sottoae Hirschmann, 1990
 Deraiophorus stammeri Hirschmann & Zirngiebl-Nicol, 1969
 Deraiophorus stammerisimilis Hirschmann, 1973
 Deraiophorus surdus Hiramatsu, 1983
 Deraiophorus talkeri Hirschmann, 1990
 Deraiophorus truncatus (Berlese, 1888)
 Deraiophorus willwanni Hirschmann & Zirngiebl-Nicol, 1969
 Deraiophorus zicsii Hirschmann, 1973

References

Mesostigmata